The Little River is a  river in the White Mountains of New Hampshire in the United States. It is a tributary of the Ammonoosuc River and part of the Connecticut River watershed.

The Little River rises in the White Mountain National Forest in a small cirque in the Twin Range, with Zealand Mountain to the east, Mount Guyot to the south, and South Twin Mountain to the west. The river flows north into the town of Bethlehem, through a deep valley between North Twin Mountain to the west and Mount Hale to the east. Eventually the river enters the town of Carroll near the community of Twin Mountain, passes under U.S. Route 3, and ends at the Ammonoosuc River.

The Little River is a public water supply for the village of Twin Mountain. A portion of the river is paralleled by (and crossed three times by) the North Twin Trail, a hiking trail.

See also

List of rivers of New Hampshire

References

Rivers of New Hampshire
Tributaries of the Connecticut River
Rivers of Grafton County, New Hampshire
Rivers of Coös County, New Hampshire